Zavolzhsky is a rural locality (a settlement) in Kislovskoye Rural Settlement, Bykovsky District, Volgograd Oblast, Russia. The population was 98 as of 2010.

Geography 
Zavolzhsky is located in Zavolzhye, 19 km north of Bykovo (the district's administrative centre) by road. Peschany is the nearest rural locality.

References 

Rural localities in Bykovsky District